Sonority may refer to:
sonorant
sonority hierarchy, a ranking of speech sounds (or phones) by amplitude
In music theory, a chord, particularly when speaking of non-traditional harmonies
Audio management software, produced by Olympus
 Sonority (album)